Linden Hall is an independent boarding school and day for girls in grades 6-12 located in Lititz, Pennsylvania. The school was founded in 1746 and is the oldest girls' boarding and day school in continuous operation in the United States.

History 
The school traces its history to November 1746, when a Moravian congregation was established in Lititz, Pennsylvania. The congregation's original building was a "Gemeinhaus," a log structure that could serve as a combined chapel, schoolhouse, and parsonage. The school educated both boys and girls. As of 1758, it reportedly enrolled "70 to 77 children." Brethren's and Sisters' Houses were built by the Moravian congregation between 1758 and 1761 to separate the activities and education of the community's unmarried men and women. The original Gemeinhaus building was taken down in 1766. For the next few years, girls' schooling occurred in the Sisters' House, while boys' schooling was closely associated with the Brethren's House. Church diaries from this period mention that girls from Moravian families in Lancaster (several miles from Lititz) were enrolling in the school and boarding with local families. The local Moravian congregation was a country congregation whose members lived on scattered farms, so it is likely that some of their daughters boarded at the school or nearby due to its distance from their homes. In May 1769, the cornerstone was laid for a new building for the girls' school to accommodate a growing student body. This building, now named Stengel Hall, is still standing as of 2020. The school's first recorded non-Moravian boarding student, Margaret "Peggy" Marvel of Baltimore, Maryland, was enrolled in 1794.

The school's name was changed from Lititz Seminary to Linden Hall in 1883. The new name referred to plantings of basswood (linden) trees on the campus.

The John Beck's Boys Academy, now defunct, also was related to the Moravian church schools established in Lititz in the 1700s.

Linden Hall added a junior college, Linden Hall Junior College, in 1935. Its offerings included a secretarial program. The school discontinued the Junior College in 1961.

The school's weekly chapel services are held in the Lititz Moravian Church and incorporate "readings, commentaries, and music that represent many of the major philosophies and religions" along with the "School's Moravian heritage".

Curriculum 
Linden Hall's curriculum is aimed at college preparation. Extracurricular activity offerings include an equestrian program. Team sports include soccer, tennis, volleyball, riding, cross country, golf, basketball, archery, and dance. A cooperative program with Warwick High School enables Linden Hall students to participate in field hockey, lacrosse, swimming, track and field, softball, and bowling teams. Upper school students can participate in an aviation program through which they can earn a pilot's license.

References

External links

Boarding schools in Pennsylvania
Girls' schools in Pennsylvania
Educational institutions established in 1746
Lititz, Pennsylvania
1740s establishments in Pennsylvania
Preparatory schools in Pennsylvania
Private high schools in Pennsylvania